In fluid dynamics, the Buckley–Leverett equation is a conservation equation used to model two-phase flow in porous media. The Buckley–Leverett equation or the Buckley–Leverett displacement describes an immiscible displacement process, such as the displacement of oil by water, in a one-dimensional or quasi-one-dimensional reservoir. This equation can be derived from the mass conservation equations of two-phase flow, under the assumptions listed below.

Equation

In a quasi-1D domain, the Buckley–Leverett equation is given by:

Typically,  is an 'S'-shaped, nonlinear function of the saturation , which characterizes the relative mobilities of the two phases:

Assumptions
The Buckley–Leverett equation is derived based on the following assumptions:
 Flow is linear and horizontal
 Both wetting and non-wetting phases are incompressible
 Immiscible phases
 Negligible capillary pressure effects (this implies that the pressures of the two phases are equal)
 Negligible gravitational forces

General solution

The characteristic velocity of the Buckley–Leverett equation is given by:

The hyperbolic nature of the equation implies that the solution of the Buckley–Leverett equation has the form , where  is the characteristic velocity given above. The non-convexity of the fractional flow function  also gives rise to the well known Buckley-Leverett profile, which consists of a shock wave immediately followed by a rarefaction wave.

See also
 Capillary pressure
 Permeability (fluid)
 Relative permeability
 Darcy's law

References

External links
 Buckley-Leverett Equation and Uses in Porous Media

Conservation equations
Equations of fluid dynamics